"Time of My Life" is a song recorded by Canadian country music artist George Fox. It was released in 1995 as the third single from his fifth studio album, Time of My Life. It peaked at number 10 on the RPM Country Tracks chart in December 1995.

Chart performance

References

1995 songs
1995 singles
George Fox songs
Warner Music Group singles
Songs written by George Fox (singer)
Songs written by Bob Gaudio
Song recordings produced by Bob Gaudio